All That Glitters... is an adventure module published in 1984 by TSR for the first edition of the Advanced Dungeons & Dragons fantasy roleplaying game. It is set in the World of Greyhawk campaign setting and is intended for 5-8 player characters of levels 5-7.

Plot summary
All That Glitters... is a scenario in which the player characters follow a treasure map through a jungle and wilderness inhabited by fierce tribesmen. The module also describes the "Wind Walkers' Passages", which are tunnels through a mountain range called the Hadarna Mountains.

The player characters acquire pieces of a map showing a journey through forest, mountains and desert leading to a temple and treasure.

Publication history
UK6 All That Glitters was written by Jim Bambra, with interior art by Tim Sell and cover art by Brian Williams, and was published by TSR in 1984 as a 32-page booklet with an outer folder. This module is part of the UK series of modules and was written and developed by TSR UK division, but was printed in the US. Graeme Morris and Tom Kirby contributed to the storyline, Phil Gallagher was in charge of production. Cartography was by Paul Ruiz.

Reception
Chris Hunter reviewed the module for Imagine magazine, giving it a favorable review. Hunter noted that, compared to UK5, this module is a more conventional "follow-the-treasure-map-adventure". Although he thought this a "hackneyed idea", Hunter considered it well executed. He described the main part of the module as "well thought out". Overall he called this "a worthwhile and interesting excursion".

References

External links
 All That Glitters...  at the TSR Archive
 United Kingdom Series (UK1 - UK7) at the Acaeum.com

Greyhawk modules
Role-playing game supplements introduced in 1984